Banksia hirta is a species of shrub that is endemic to Western Australia. It has hairy stems, deeply serrated leaves, pale yellow flowers in heads of about one hundred and shining follicles. It is restricted to the Stirling Range National Park.

Description
There are between five and ten sharply-pointed, triangular lobes on each side of the leaves.

Taxonomy and naming
This banksia was first formally described in 1996 by Alex George who gave it the name Dryandra hirsuta and published the description in the journal Nuytsia from specimens collected in the Stirling Range National Park in 1986. The specific epithet (hirsuta) is a Latin word meaning "having long, rather coarse hairs" referring to the stems, young leaves and involucral bracts.

In 2007, Austin Mast and Kevin Thiele transferred all the Dryandra species to Banksia but as the name Banksia hirsuta had already been used by Otto Kuntze for a species now accepted as Pimelea latifolia subsp. hirsuta Mast and Thiele changed the epithet to hirta, a Latin word with a similar meaning to "hirsutus".

Distribution and habitat
Banksia hirta grows in rocky shrubland and woodland in the central and western parts of the Stirling Range.

Conservation status
This banksia is classified as "Priority Three" by the Government of Western Australia Department of Parks and Wildlife meaning that it is poorly known and known from only a few locations but is not under imminent threat.

References

hirta
Endemic flora of Western Australia
Plants described in 1996
Taxa named by Alex George